Dölf Mettler (22 May 1934 – 15 October 2015) was a Swiss yodeler, composer and painter.

References

20th-century Swiss painters
Swiss male painters
21st-century Swiss painters
21st-century Swiss male artists
Swiss composers
Swiss male composers
Yodelers
1934 births
2015 deaths
20th-century Swiss male artists